Langville may refer to:

Places 
 Langville, Pennsylvania
 Laingville, a suburb of St Helena Bay, South Africa
 A former name of Capay, California

People 
 Amy Langville